Nicolas Bourriaud (born 1965) is a curator and art critic, who has curated a great number of exhibitions and biennials all over the world.

With Jérôme Sans, Bourriaud cofounded the Palais de Tokyo in Paris, where he served as codirector from 1999 to 2006. He was the Paris correspondent for Flash Art (1987–1995) and the founder and director of the contemporary art magazine Documents sur l'art (1992–2000). Bourriaud was the Gulbenkian curator of contemporary art from 2007 to 2010 at Tate Britain in London. In 2009 he curated the fourth Tate Triennial, titled Altermodern. He was the Director of the École Nationale Supérieure des Beaux-Arts, an art school in Paris, France, from 2011 to 2015. In 2015 Bourriaud was appointed director of the La Panacée art centre (a.k.a. MO.CO.PANACÉE) and the director of the Contemporary Art Center of Montpellier, France (aka MO.CO.).

Writing

Bourriaud is best known among English speakers for his publications Relational Aesthetics (1998/English version 2002), Postproduction (2001), and The Exform (2015/ English version 2016). Relational Aesthetics in particular has come to be seen as a defining text for a wide variety of art produced by a generation who came to prominence in Europe in the early 1990s. Bourriaud coined the term in 1995, in a text for the catalogue of the exhibition Traffic that was shown at the CAPC contemporary art museum  in Bordeaux.

In Postproduction (2001), Bourriaud relates deejaying to contemporary art. Radicant (2009) aims to define the emergence of the first global modernity, based on translation and nomadic forms, against the postmodern aesthetics based on identities. In The Exform (2016), Bourriaud examines the dynamics of ideology, specifically as it was developed in the work of Louis Althusser, to account for distinctions between the productive and unproductive, product and waste, and the included and excluded in their relation to society and art production.

Books
 Formes de vie. L’art moderne et l’invention de soi. Paris: Editions Denoël, 1999. 
 Relational Aesthetics. Paris: Presses du réel, 2002. 
 Postproduction: Culture as Screenplay: How Art Reprograms the World. New York: Lukas & Sternberg, 2002. . Translated by Jeanine Herman.
 Touch: Relational Art from the 1990s to Now. San Francisco: San Francisco Art Institute, 2002.
 Playlist. Paris: Palais de Tokyo: Editions cercle d'art, 2004. 
 The Radicant , Sternberg Press, 2009. . Translated by James Gussen and Lili Porten.
 Radikant. Berlin: Merve, 2009. 
 Altermodern. Tate, 2009. 
 La Exforma. Buenos Aires: Adriana Hidalgo Editora, 2015. 
 The Exform. Brooklyn, NY: Verso, 2016.

Curated exhibitions
 Courts Métrages Immobiles, Venice Biennale, 1990
 Aperto '93, Venice Biennale, 1993
 Commerce, Espace St Nicolas, Paris, 1994
 Traffic, Capc Bordeaux, 1996
 Joint Ventures, Basilico Gallery, New York, 1996
 Le Capital, CRAC Sète, 1999
 Contacts, Kunsthalle Fri-Art, Fribourg, Switzerland, 2000
 Négociations, CRAC, Sète, 2000
 Touch, San Francisco Art Institute, 2002
 GNS (Global Navigation System), Palais de Tokyo, Paris, 2003
 Playlist, Palais de Tokyo, Paris, 2004
 Notre Histoire, Palais de Tokyo, Paris, 2006
 Moscow Biennale, 2005 and 2007 (with Backstein, Boubnova, Birnbaum, Obrist, Martinez)
 Estratos, Murcia, 2008.
 The Tate Triennial 2009: Altermodern, Tate Britain, London, 2009
 Athens Biennial 2011 : Monodrome.
 The Angel of history, Palais des Beaux-arts, Paris, 2013. 
 Cookbook, Palais des Beaux-arts, Paris, 2013. 
 Taipei Biennial 2014, The Great acceleration. 
 Kaunas Biennial 2015, Threads : a fantasmagoria about distance.

References

External links
List of  selected curated shows and photo
Talk: Today's Art Practice
"Islets" and Utopia
Object lessons: Nicolas Bourriaud on Pierre Restany
McCollum's Aura: Nicolas Bourriaud on Allan McCollum
On Altermodernity. Nicolas Bourriaud in an interview

French art critics
1965 births
Living people
People from Niort
Academic staff of Paris Sciences et Lettres University
French male non-fiction writers
French art curators